Catherine Malloy Hollern (born 12 April 1955) is a British Labour Party politician serving as Member of Parliament (MP) for Blackburn since 2015. A member of the opposition front bench under the leadership of both Jeremy Corbyn and Keir Starmer, she previously served as the Parliamentary Private Secretary (PPS) to the former from 2017 to 2020, a Shadow Minister for Local Government from 2020 until her resignation in 2021, and briefly a shadow defence minister in 2016. Prior to her election to Parliament, she served as the leader of Blackburn with Darwen Borough Council.

Early life and career
Hollern moved to Blackburn in the late 1970s. She worked as a supervisor at Newman's Footwear, before becoming the contracts manager at Blackburn College. She has two daughters.

Hollern led the Labour Group on the Blackburn with Darwen Borough Council from 2004 to 2015, serving as council leader from 2004 to 2007, and again from 2010 to 2015.

Parliamentary career
In March 2014, Hollern was selected, using an all-women shortlist, to succeed former cabinet minister Jack Straw as Labour's candidate for the constituency of Blackburn. She was elected in the 2015 general election. Hollern served as Shadow Minister for the Armed Forces from January 2016 to October 2016, following the reshuffle of the Shadow Cabinet, and resignation of Kevan Jones.

She supported Owen Smith in the failed attempt to replace Jeremy Corbyn in the leadership election. On 10 October 2016, she was appointed Shadow Minister for Communities and Local Government. In July 2017, Hollern was appointed Corbyn's Parliamentary Private Secretary.

Following Keir Starmer's election as Labour leader, Hollern served as Shadow Minister for Communities and Local Government from 2020. She resigned on 12 May 2021 after being accused of trying to "isolate a parliamentary worker who had made allegations of sexual harassment" against former Labour MP Mike Hill.

Personal life
Her partner was Labour Party councillor John Roberts, until his death in February 2017.

References

External links

Kate Hollern profile Blackburn with Darwen Council

1955 births
Living people
21st-century British women politicians
21st-century Scottish women
Councillors in Lancashire
Female members of the Parliament of the United Kingdom for English constituencies
Labour Party (UK) councillors
Labour Party (UK) MPs for English constituencies
Members of the Parliament of the United Kingdom for constituencies in Lancashire
People from Dumbarton
Politics of Blackburn with Darwen
UK MPs 2015–2017
UK MPs 2017–2019
UK MPs 2019–present
Women councillors in England